The Osage County Courthouse in Lyndon, Kansas is a historic courthouse built in 1923.  Located at 717 Topeka Avenue, it was listed on the National Register of Historic Places in 2007.

The courthouse is a three-story reinforced concrete building faced with tooled limestone on its first floor, and brick and clay tile above. It has frame floors and a frame/steel truss roof.

The listing included two contributing buildings (the courthouse and a jail building) and two non-contributing ones (another jail building and a shed).  It also includes three contributing objects (a World War I memorial, a flag pole, a Korean War memorial) and two non-contributing objects (a 1969 Memorial and a Vietnam War memorial).

References

External links

Government buildings on the National Register of Historic Places in Kansas
Government buildings completed in 1923
Osage County, Kansas
Courthouses in Kansas